Simmons & Simmons is an international law firm headquatered in London, England. About half of its staff are in the London office, in CityPoint, off Moorgate. It has offices in Europe, the United States, the Middle East and Asia. The firm serves customers worldwide, with practices covering asset management, investment funds, energy and infrastructure, finance, life sciences, technology, media, and telecommunications sectors.

It has been mentioned in the Financial Times Innovative Lawyers Report.

History
The firm was founded in 1896 by twin brother, Percy and Edward Simmons, while both were 21 years old.

In 1962, the firm opened its second office, in Brussels.

In 1972, the firm opened its third office and its first in Asia, in Hong Kong.

In 1988, the firm continued its expansion in Europe, opening its practice in Paris.

In 1993, the firm opened its practices in Milan and Rome.

In 1994, the firm began its first foray into the Middle East, opening an office in Abu Dhabi.

In 1995, the firm opened its second office in Asia, in Shanghai.

Clients 

 Former partner Edward Troup represented Blairmore Holdings, Inc., the Panama-registered fund created by Ian Cameron, David Cameron's father.
 The firm represented Enpal, the fastest growing energy company in Europe based on Financial Times's FT1000 Ranking 2022, in its €855 million financing round from investors such as BlackRock and ING. Simmons also earlier represented Enpal in its debt fundraising round in 2021.
 Simmons & Simmons advised Chelsea FC in it’s £4.25bn sale to a consortium led by Todd Boehly and Clearlake Capital.

See also
List of largest law firms by revenue
List of largest law firms by profits per partner

References

Law firms of the United Kingdom
Companies based in the City of London
Law firms established in 1896
Foreign law firms with offices in Hong Kong
Foreign law firms with offices in Japan
Foreign law firms with offices in the Netherlands
Biopharmaceutical law firms
1896 establishments in England
British companies established in 1896